Geophis hoffmanni, also known as Hoffmann's earth snake, is a snake of the colubrid family. It is found in Honduras, Nicaragua, Costa Rica, and Panama.

References

Geophis
Snakes of North America
Reptiles of Honduras
Reptiles of Nicaragua
Reptiles of Costa Rica
Reptiles of Panama
Taxa named by Wilhelm Peters
Reptiles described in 1859